Champagne Eyes is the second EP by English electronic music duo AlunaGeorge. It was released on 5 October 2018. The album includes collaborations with Bryson Tiller, Cautious Clay, and Baauer. The lead single, "Superior Emotion", was released in September 2018, featuring vocals from singer Cautious Clay.

Background
Francis and Reid have been on hiatus since releasing I Remember (2016). Champagne Eyes is their first independent release, and they were able to have total creative freedom on the EP. Bryson Tiller features on "Cold Blooded Creatures" and Cautious Clay features on "Superior Emotion", which were said to have "sultry, sensual sound that could never be labeled as a single genre" by Billboard. The EP also features elements of R&B, pop and dance, and was compared to the "cool, fearless vibe" of the duo's 2013 debut album Body Music.

Track listing

References

2018 EPs
AlunaGeorge albums